Oligarchy is a conceptual form of power structure in which power rests with a small number of people. These people may or may not be distinguished by one or several characteristics, such as nobility, fame, wealth, education, or corporate, religious, political, or military control.

Throughout history, power structures considered to be oligarchies have often been viewed as tyrannical, relying on public obedience or oppression to exist. Aristotle pioneered the use of the term as meaning rule by the rich, for which another term commonly used today is plutocracy. One of the first oligarchies in history is that of Sparta, which developed the concept alongside its rival Athens, and essentially provided a counterpoint to Athenian democracy.  In the early 20th century Robert Michels developed the theory that democracies, like all large organizations, tend to turn into oligarchies. In his "Iron law of oligarchy" he suggests that the necessary division of labor in large organizations leads to the establishment of a ruling class mostly concerned with protecting their own power.

Minority rule 

The exclusive consolidation of power by a dominant religious or ethnic minority has also been described as a form of oligarchy. Examples of this system include South Africa under apartheid, Liberia under Americo-Liberians, the Sultanate of Zanzibar, and Rhodesia, where the installation of oligarchic rule by the descendants of foreign settlers was primarily regarded as a legacy of various forms of colonialism.

Putative oligarchies 
A business group might be defined as an oligarchy if it satisfies all of the following conditions:
 Owners are the largest private owners in the country.
 It possesses sufficient political power to promote its own interests.
 Owners control multiple businesses, which intensively coordinate their activities.

Intellectual oligarchies
George Bernard Shaw defined in his play Major Barbara, premiered in 1905 and first published in 1907, a new type of Oligarchy namely the intellectual oligarchy that acts against the interests of the common people: "I now want to give the common man weapons against the intellectual man. I love the common people. I want to arm them against the lawyer, the doctor, the priest, the literary man, the professor, the artist, and the politician, who, once in authority, is the most dangerous, disastrous, and tyrannical of all the fools, rascals, and impostors. I want a democratic power strong enough to force the intellectual oligarchy to use its genius for the general good or else perish."

Cases perceived as oligarchies
Jeffrey A. Winters and Benjamin I. Page have described Colombia, Indonesia, Russia, Singapore, and the United States as oligarchies.

Philippines 

During the presidency of Ferdinand Marcos from 1965 to 1986, several monopolies arose in the Philippines, particularly centred around the family and close associates of the president. This period, as well as subsequent decades, have led some analysts to describe the country as an oligarchy. President Rodrigo Duterte, who was elected in 2016, spoke of dismantling oligarchy during his presidency.

Russian Federation

Since the collapse of the Soviet Union and privatization of the economy in December 1991, privately owned Russia-based multinational corporations, including producers of petroleum, natural gas, and metal have, in the view of many analysts, led to the rise of Russian oligarchs. Most of these are connected directly to the highest-ranked government officials, such as the president.

Iran 

The religious government of Iran formed after the 1979 Iranian revolution is described as a clerical oligarchy led by a coalition of militant Khomeinist ideologues and fundamentalist Shia clergy. The ruling system led by clerical oligarchs is known as "Velayat e-Faqih" , i.e, governance by a class of Twelver Shia marja designated with the title of "Ayatollah". Highest ranking Shia cleric in the political system is the "Rahbar" (Supreme Leader) who serves for life and is considered to be a Ma'sum (infallible) and "protector of the faith" in Khomeinist theology. The clerical oligarchs supervise the activities of the parliament and controls the armed forces, state media, sectors of the national economy and religious funds. The Rahbar is also the military chief of the Iranian armed forces and directly controls the conglomerate of Khomeinist paramilitaries known as the IRGC.

Ukraine

The Ukrainian oligarchs are a group of business oligarchs that quickly appeared on the economic and political scene of Ukraine after its independence in 1991. Overall there are 35 oligarchic groups.

On 23 September 2021 the Ukrainian government released law № 1780-ІХ which is primarily focused on protecting national interest and limiting oligarchs impact on democracy in Ukraine.

United States

Some contemporary authors have characterized conditions in the United States in the 21st century as oligarchic in nature. Simon Johnson wrote in 2009 that "the reemergence of an American financial oligarchy is quite recent", a structure which he delineated as being the "most advanced" in the world. Jeffrey A. Winters wrote that "oligarchy and democracy operate within a single system, and American politics is a daily display of their interplay." The top 1% of the U.S. population by wealth in 2007 had a larger share of total income than at any time since 1928. In 2011, according to PolitiFact and others, the top 400 wealthiest Americans "have more wealth than half of all Americans combined."

In 1998, Bob Herbert of The New York Times referred to modern American plutocrats as "The Donor Class" (list of top donors) and defined the class, for the first time, as "a tiny group—just one-quarter of 1 percent of the population—and it is not representative of the rest of the nation. But its money buys plenty of access."

French economist Thomas Piketty states in his 2013 book, Capital in the Twenty-First Century, that "the risk of a drift towards oligarchy is real and gives little reason for optimism about where the United States is headed."

A 2014 study by political scientists Martin Gilens of Princeton University and Benjamin Page of Northwestern University stated that "majorities of the American public actually have little influence over the policies our government adopts." The study analyzed nearly 1,800 policies enacted by the US government between 1981 and 2002 and compared them to the expressed preferences of the American public as opposed to wealthy Americans and large special interest groups. It found that wealthy individuals and organizations representing business interests have substantial political influence, while average citizens and mass-based interest groups have little to none. The study did concede that "Americans do enjoy many features central to democratic governance, such as regular elections, freedom of speech and association, and a widespread (if still contested) franchise." Gilens and Page do not characterize the US as an "oligarchy" per se; however, they do apply the concept of "civil oligarchy" as used by Jeffrey Winters with respect to the US. Winters has posited a comparative theory of "oligarchy" in which the wealthiest citizens – even in a "civil oligarchy" like the United States – dominate policy concerning crucial issues of wealth- and income protection.

Gilens says that average citizens only get what they want if wealthy Americans and business-oriented interest groups also want it; and that when a policy favored by the majority of the American public is implemented, it is usually because the economic elites did not oppose it. Other studies have criticized the Page and Gilens study. Page and Gilens have defended their study from criticism.

In a 2015 interview, former President Jimmy Carter stated that the United States is now "an oligarchy with unlimited political bribery" due to the Citizens United v. FEC ruling which effectively removed limits on donations to political candidates. Wall Street spent a record $2 billion trying to influence the 2016 United States presidential election.

See also 

 Aristocracy
 Cacique democracy
 Despotism
 Dictatorship
 Inverted totalitarianism
 Iron law of oligarchy
 Kleptocracy
 Meritocracy
 Military dictatorship
 Minoritarianism
 Nepotism
 Netocracy
 Oligopoly
 Oligarchical collectivism
 Parasitism 
 Plutocracy
 Political family
 Power behind the throne
 The Power Elite (1956 book by C. Wright Mills)
 Polyarchy
 Stratocracy
 Synarchism
 Theocracy
 Timocracy

References

Further reading 
 
 
 
 
 Ostwald, M. Oligarchia: The Development of a Constitutional Form in Ancient Greece (Historia Einzelschirften; 144). Stuttgart: Steiner, 2000.

External links

 
Authoritarianism
Political culture